Visakhapatnam is Metro City in the state of Andhra Pradesh and also largest city in the state. Visakhapatnam history dates from 2500 years ago and the present name is given by Eastern Chalukyas king to their Family deity Visakha in 1010 AD.

Ancient history
Historically this area is under Kalinga Kingdom  in 260 BC Ashoka won Kalinga War then area come under Maurya Empire. in rule of Ashoka this region was dominated with Buddhism lot of Buddhist monuments were constructed like Thotlakonda, Bavikonda and Bojjannakonda.  between C 2nd BC to C 2nd AD Buddhism played a key role in this region. after Maurya Empire this region  under Satavahana.

Eastern Calicut

Eastern Chalukyas conquered this region in 7th Century AD and during regime a very important  Simhachalam Temple was constructed.  marital relationship between Eastern Chalukyas and Chola's the city named as Kulothunga Cholapatnam to the honor of Kulottunga I.

Reddi Kingdom and Gajapati Empire
in 14th century Visakhapatnam in Reddi kingdom they ruled whole Coastal Andhra region in that period. and later this area is part of Gajapati kingdom.

Vijayanagara Empire

in 1515 AD Krishnadevaraya Ruler of Vijayanagara Empire concurred the north Costal Andhra and he defeated the Gajapati Empire at battle of Potnuru near Padmanabham and he setup Vijayasthupa (victory Pillar).  Krishnadevaraya also visited Simhachalam Temple on his visit  he gifted valuable ornaments to Temple.

British India
In the 17th century, Vizianagaram estate  and some local Zamindari's started ruling in Visakhapatnam,  on 10 July 1794 Battle of Padmanabham between Vizianagaram estate led by Vijayaramaraju and East India Company forces in that battle Vijayaramaraju defeated by  British Army Col. Pendargest later East India Company direct ruled total north Coastal Andhra.

1800 to 1947 
in 1803 Vizagapatam District formed. and in 1861 Vizagapatam Municipality formed.   on 19 December 1933 major mile stone happens in Visakhapatnam history that is Visakhapatnam Port has starts working and its changed the fate of city from small town from industrial city. 
The Name VIZAG was coined by Britishers and it is derived from the same source, there is a Dargah of Hazrat ISSAC Madina Baba, on hilltop beside Hill Chapel which is approx 700 yrs old and records prove that Moghul Emperor Aurangzeb visited this shrine. The town was then known as Isakh-Patnam, corresponding to Prophet Issaq (Islamic) and Issac as per biblical pronunciation, henceforth the Britishers called Issac-patnam. The prefix of "V" was added to signify South Indianness dominance, as people of Bengal could not pronounce "B".

Post-independence (1947–present)
on 15 August 1947, India got independence after independence Madras Presidency divided and Visakhapatnam in Andhra Pradesh State in that day from present-day Visakhapatnam started a long development journey and playing a key role in Andhra Pradesh state Economy and 10th wealthiest City in India.

See also
 Visakhapatnam
 Vizagapatam district
 History of Andhra Pradesh
 History of India

References

History of Andhra Pradesh